Sarah Northey was a silver medalist in the ladies synchronized swimming event at the 1990 Commonwealth Games. Born in Taunton, Somerset, she later moved to Reading. Sarah is the youngest of three daughters by Colin and Jacqueline Northey.

References

British synchronised swimmers
Synchronised swimmers at the 1990 Commonwealth Games
Living people
Commonwealth Games silver medallists for England
English female swimmers
Commonwealth Games medallists in synchronised swimming
Year of birth missing (living people)
Medallists at the 1990 Commonwealth Games